The Iran Banking Institute (IBI) is a higher education institution established in 1963 in Iran and is affiliated with the Central Bank of Iran.

It hosts the annual 'Islamic Banking Conference', which is a forum for academic and banking individuals on a local and international level to discuss the experience and challenges of Iran's banking system in interacting with the regulations of international Islamic banking.

References

External links

Official website

Business schools in Iran
1963 establishments in Iran
Universities in Tehran
Educational institutions established in 1963
Higher education in Iran